Elizabeth Ann Moeggenberg (born Shimek May 25, 1984 in Empire, Michigan) was drafted by the Phoenix Mercury of the WNBA, was then traded to the Houston Comets and then weeks later traded to the Chicago Sky where she played for two seasons.

Shimek attended college at Michigan State University and graduated in 2006.  Following her collegiate career, she was selected 18th overall in the 2006 WNBA Draft.

She married Lucas Moeggenberg in October 2006. The couple has three sons.

In 2012, Liz Shimek Moeggenberg returned to her alma mater, and now coaches the Glen Lake girls junior varsity basketball team, the Lakers.

Michigan  State statistics

Source

WNBA career
Moeggenberg played two seasons for the Chicago Sky (2006, 2007).

USA Basketball
Moeggenberg was a member of the team representing the US at the 2005 World University Games Team in Izmir, Turkey. In the game against China, she led her team in scoring with 23 points. In the semi-final against Russia, she led the team with 25 points, helping the team win 118–67. Moeggenberg averaged 7.3 points per game, and 6.6 rebounds, second best on the team while helping the team to a 7–0 record, resulting in a gold medal at the event.

Overseas career

References

External links 

LFB Player Profile (French Championship)

1984 births
Living people
American expatriate basketball people in France
American people of Czech descent
American women's basketball coaches
American women's basketball players
Basketball players from Michigan
Chicago Sky players
Michigan State Spartans women's basketball players
People from Leelanau County, Michigan
Phoenix Mercury draft picks
Small forwards
Tarbes Gespe Bigorre players
Universiade gold medalists for the United States
Universiade medalists in basketball